Emmanuelle Millet is a French director and screenwriter.

Filmography 

 2003 : Douce Errance
 2005 : T'as un rôle à jouer !
 2007 : Dix films pour en parler
 2011 : Twiggy

External links

References 

French directors
French screenwriters